Taira Dam  is a dam in the Nagano Prefecture, Japan, completed in 1957. It is a gravity-type concrete dam with a height of 19.5 meters and is owned by TEPCO Renewable Power. It can generate up to 15,600 kilowatts of electricity.

References

Dams in Nagano Prefecture
Dams completed in 1957